Adolphe-Édouard Défossé (20 January 1855 – 15 March 1922) was a French politician. He served as a member of the Chamber of Deputies from 1914 to 1919, representing Nord.

References

1855 births
1922 deaths
People from Nord (French department)
Politicians from Hauts-de-France
Radical Party (France) politicians
Members of the 11th Chamber of Deputies of the French Third Republic